Ismail Sidky Pasha (15 June 1875 – 9 July 1950) was an Egyptian politician who served as Prime Minister of Egypt from 1930 to 1933 and again in 1946.

Life and career
He was born in Alexandria and was originally named Isma'il Saddiq but his name was changed after his namesake fell out of favor.

Sidky graduated from Collège des Frères in Cairo and the Khedival Law School, then joined the public prosecutor's office. In 1899 he became administrative secretary of the Alexandria municipal commission, serving until 1914, when he was appointed minister of agriculture and later minister of waqfs (Islamic endowments).

In 1915, Sidky joined the nationalist Wafd Party and was eventually deported to Malta with party founder Saad Zaghloul and other loyalists in 1919. Following World War I Sidky left the Wafd Party. He served as Minister of Finance in 1921 and 1922 and as minister of interior in 1922 and from 1924 to 1925. He then retired from politics.

He returned to politics in the 1930s to serve as prime minister from June 1930 to September 1933, running as a candidate for the People's Party. He was known as a strong leader and fought the influence of his former Wafd Party. He joined an all-party delegation to negotiate the Anglo-Egyptian treaty of 1936, which established Egypt as a technically sovereign state, although still under British control.

During his first tenure as Prime Minister, Sidky pressed for the enactment of mortgage lending reforms aimed at restructuring the relationship of foreign lenders such as Crédit Foncier Egyptienne, the Mortgage Company of Egypt, and The Land Bank of Egypt with qualifying Egyptian mortgage debtors. On 3 February 1933 the Legislative Assembly of the Mixed Court of Appeals approved a law decreed by King Fuad and signed by the King, Sidki, and Egyptian Minister of Justice Ahmed Ali relative to properties in process of foreclosure with the Mixed Court System, known as Law 7 of 1933. Having begun the process of mortgage loan reforms in 1933, subsequent governments followed essentially the same practices, all in the context of foreclosure pressures experienced during the global economic depression of the 1930s, e.g., decret-loi no. 72 de 1935, and Law 47 of 1936, and Law 48 of 1936, each of which may be viewed in light of the negotiations leading to the Anglo-Egyptian Treaty of 1936.

In 1938 Sidky retired from politics again. He returned to politics one last time in February 1946 as Prime Minister, seeking to revise the Anglo-Egyptian Treaty. After failing to unite Egypt and Sudan under Egyptian sovereignty, Sidky resigned from the office on 8 December 1946. He was succeeded by Mahmoud el Nokrashy Pasha.

References

External links
The Sidqi years via Al-Ahram

20th-century prime ministers of Egypt
1875 births
1950 deaths
Agriculture Ministers of Egypt
Interior Ministers of Egypt
Finance Ministers of Egypt
Politicians from Alexandria
Wafd Party politicians
Endowments Ministers of Egypt